Ángel Orlando Rojas Ortega (born April 10, 1985) is a Chilean footballer who plays for Deportes Recoleta as midfielder.

Career
Rojas began his career in the youth system of Universidad de Chile before making his debut in the 2004 tournament. He won 2008 Apertura tournament with Everton, defeating Colo-Colo in the final. He joined Goiás Esporte Clube of the Campeonato Brasileiro Série A on December 3, 2009. Rojas returned to Universidad de Chile on June 11, 2010 and played in the semi-finals of Copa Libertadores 2010 and the second leg of the Chilean Tournament. He played on loan at Everton in the 2011 Apertura Tournament.

Honours

Club
Universidad de Chile
 Primera División de Chile (2): 2004 Apertura, 2009 Apertura

Everton
 Primera División de Chile (1): 2008 Apertura

References

External links

1985 births
Living people
People from Santiago
People from Santiago Province, Chile
People from Santiago Metropolitan Region
Footballers from Santiago
Chilean footballers
Chile youth international footballers
Chile under-20 international footballers
Chilean expatriate footballers
Association football midfielders
Universidad de Chile footballers
Everton de Viña del Mar footballers
Goiás Esporte Clube players
San Luis de Quillota footballers
PAE Kerkyra players
AO Chania F.C. players
Coquimbo Unido footballers
Deportes Recoleta footballers
Chilean Primera División players
Campeonato Brasileiro Série A players
Primera B de Chile players
Super League Greece players
Football League (Greece) players
Segunda División Profesional de Chile players
Chilean expatriate sportspeople in Brazil
Expatriate footballers in Brazil
Chilean expatriate sportspeople in Greece
Expatriate footballers in Greece